Mulranny—sometimes spelled as 'Mallaranny', 'Mulrany', 'Malaranny', 'Mullaranny', 'Mullranny' or 'Mulranny'—is a seaside village on the isthmus between Clew Bay and Blacksod Bay in County Mayo, Ireland. Mulranny, located at the foot of the Nephin Mountain Range, has a number of blue flag beaches and a coastal lagoon. The Corraun Peninsula, which contains three mountain peaks, is situated across Clew Bay.

Transport
Mulranny is located on the N59 national secondary road. Bus routes serving the area include Bus Éireann route 450 (Dooagh-Westport-Louisburgh) and Local Link route 978 (Castlebar-Belmullet).

Tourism
Mulranny lies on the 42 km Great Western Greenway, which runs between Westport and Achill. In 2011, it was the winner of a 'European Destinations of Excellence' award.

A type of heather, Erica erigena, which is unique to the area, is celebrated during the annual summer "Mulranny Mediterranean Heather Festival".

Notable people
 Colm McManamon, Gaelic footballer.
 Ernst Chain, credited with developing the application of penicillin alongside Alexander Fleming, had a home in the area.
 Desmond Llewelyn, known for his role as "Q" in the James Bond movies, also had a home locally.
 Mulloy Brothers, a traditional Irish music group.
 Jerry Cowley, Irish barrister, medical doctor and former politician, lives locally.
 Ollie Conmy, former Irish international soccer player.
 Matt McManamon,  a Liverpool-born musician who moved to Mulranny in the late 2000s

See also
 List of towns and villages in Ireland

References

Towns and villages in County Mayo